Mary Rosalind Morris (M. Rosalind Morris) (May 8, 1920 – March 26, 2022) was a professor of plant cytogenetics at the University of Nebraska-Lincoln from 1947 to 1990. She was one of the first women to earn a doctoral degree in genetics and plant breeding from Cornell University, was the first female faculty member in the Department of Agronomy and Horticulture at UNL, and was the first woman fellow of the American Society of Agronomy. Her pioneering work on "misbehaving chromosomes" in wheat cytogenetics was internationally recognized. In 1980, she served as president of the Nebraska Academy of Sciences. She was awarded a fellowship with the American Association for the Advancement of Science and a Guggenheim Fellowship. She was born in Wales and immigrated with her family to Forest, Ontario, Canada as a child. She died on March 26, just before her 102nd birthday.

Selected publications 

 Morris, Rosalind; ------ (1967). "The cytogenetics of wheat and its relatives." In K.S. Quisenberry; L.P. Reitz (eds). Wheat and Wheat Improvement. Madison, Wisconsin: American Society of Agronomy. pp. 19–87.

References

1920 births
2022 deaths
American women geneticists
American geneticists
Plant geneticists
20th-century American women scientists
Welsh emigrants to the United States
University of Nebraska–Lincoln faculty
Cornell University alumni
Fellows of the American Association for the Advancement of Science